The Mount Elliott mine is a large copper mine located in eastern Australia in Queensland. Ernest Henry represents one of the largest copper reserves in Australia and in the world having estimated reserves of 475 million tonnes of ore grading 0.5% copper and 4.56 million oz of gold.

References 

Copper mines in Queensland
Gold mines in Queensland